Mann Township is a township in Bedford County, Pennsylvania, United States. The population was 504 at the 2020 census.

Geography
Mann Township is located in the southeastern corner of Bedford County, with Fulton County to the east and Allegany County, Maryland, to the south.

Adjacent municipalities
Southampton Township (west)
Monroe Township (north)
Union Township, Fulton County (east)
Allegany County, Maryland (south)

Recreation
Portions of the Buchanan State Forest and portions of the Pennsylvania State Game Lands Number 49 are located in the township.

Demographics

As of the 2000 census, there were 481 people, 191 households, and 141 families residing in the township.  The population density was 13.4 people per square mile (5.2/km2).  There were 385 housing units at an average density of 10.7/sq mi (4.1/km2).  The racial makeup of the township was 99.17% White, 0.21% African American, 0.21% Asian, and 0.42% from two or more races.

There were 191 households, out of which 29.3% had children under the age of 18 living with them, 61.3% were married couples living together, 6.8% had a female householder with no husband present, and 25.7% were non-families. 22.5% of all households were made up of individuals, and 7.3% had someone living alone who was 65 years of age or older.  The average household size was 2.52 and the average family size was 2.94.

In the township the population was spread out, with 24.7% under the age of 18, 4.8% from 18 to 24, 27.9% from 25 to 44, 29.9% from 45 to 64, and 12.7% who were 65 years of age or older.  The median age was 40 years. For every 100 females, there were 103.0 males.  For every 100 females age 18 and over, there were 100.0 males.

The median income for a household in the township was $28,929, and the median income for a family was $33,077. Males had a median income of $26,339 versus $17,813 for females. The per capita income for the township was $13,893.  About 12.8% of families and 14.9% of the population were below the poverty line, including 16.3% of those under age 18 and 15.5% of those age 65 or over.

References

Populated places established in 1808
Townships in Bedford County, Pennsylvania